Paris Basketball is a French professional basketball club based in Paris. The club currently plays in the LNB Pro A, the first division of basketball in France, and the EuroCup.

The club was founded in 2018 by David Kahn and Eric Schwartz. The team plays its home games at the Halle Georges Carpentier. Three years after its establishment, Paris promoted to the first-level Pro A for the first time.

History
The club started as a project to bring a big basketball club to the city of Paris, led by David Kahn, former director of the Minnesota Timberwolves of the National Basketball Association (NBA). In July 2018, the creation of the professional club was announced. At the revealing, the ambitions were to be a team in the EuroLeague, the highest-level European league, by 2022. The future home arena of the team would be an arena in Porte de la Chapelle, that was constructed for the 2024 Olympics. The team immediately entered the LNB Pro B, the national second-tier league, as the club bought the licence of HTV Basket. The club would play its home games in the Halle Georges Carpentier, waiting for the construction of the Paris Arena II.

In the 2020–21 season, Paris finished in the second place in the LNB Pro B championship and thus were promoted to the LNB Pro A for the first time in club history.

The team was selected to play in the 2022–23 season of the EuroCup, its debut in European competition.

Honours
LNB Pro B
Runners-up (1): 2020–21

Season by season

Players

Current roster

Notable players

Head coaches

References

External links
Official website

Basketball teams established in 2018
Basketball teams in France
Basketball teams in Paris